Probka Restaurant Group (Russian Cyrillic: ресторанная группа Пробка) is a restaurant group that was founded by Aram Mnatsakanov in 2001 with the establishment of the wine bar, Probka (English translation: wine bottle cork), and the Italian restaurant, Il Grappolo, in St. Petersburg. It now consists of nine Italian restaurants and one Russian restaurant which are spread all over St. Petersburg. It consists of Ryba Na Dache, Probka, Mozzarella Bar, Gusto and Il Grappolo restaurants among others. The Probka restaurant network consists of a strict Italian cuisine. Although this is the case, the group is experimenting with Asian cuisine as well. To date there are three restaurants with the name "Mozzarella Bar," the last one having been opened in February 2010. These restaurants are among the most successful and popular in St. Petersburg. Probka has become a very influential group in the Russian restaurant industry with mainly Italian cuisine.

References

External links

 Probka Restaurant Group Corporate Website

Restaurants established in 2001
Italian restaurants
Restaurants in Russia
Russian companies established in 2001